Mudlo is a locality in the Gympie Region, Queensland, Australia.

Geography 
Most of the northern part of the locality is within the Grongah National Park and some of the southern locality being in the Mudlo National Park and the Calgoa State Forest. The developed land is used for cattle raising.

Mudlo Road passes through the locality from Kilkivan to the south and Tansey in the west.

Education 
There are no schools in Mudlo. The nearest primary school is in neighbouring Kilkivan. The nearest secondary schools are in Murgon and Gympie.

References 

Gympie Region
Localities in Queensland